The United Rubber Workers of Great Britain was an organisation representing workers involved in the processing of rubber and other waterproof materials in the United Kingdom.

The union was founded in 1889 as the Waterproof Trade Union, then in 1891 changed its name to the India Rubber, Cable and Asbestos Workers' Union.  Before World War I it was renamed the United Rubber Workers of Great Britain.  Its membership fell to only 312 in 1936, at the end of a long trade depression, but it survived and by 1945, membership had risen to more than 4,000 people.  It then changed its name to the Rubber, Plastic and Allied Workers' Union.

In 1974, the union merged into the National Union of General and Municipal Workers.

Secretaries
1910s: H. H. Duke

1936: Herbert Eastwood
1954: Laurence Walsh

References

Defunct trade unions of the United Kingdom
Trade unions established in 1889
Trade unions disestablished in 1974
1889 establishments in the United Kingdom
Plastics and rubber trade unions
GMB (trade union) amalgamations
Rubber industry
Trade unions based in Greater Manchester